Jim Ahern may refer to:
 Jim Ahern (golfer) (born 1949), American golfer
 Jim Ahern (Gaelic footballer) (1922–1988), Irish Gaelic footballer